The Nakajima Ki-62 was a  Japanese World War II fighter aircraft proposed by the Nakajima Aircraft Company for use by the Imperial Japanese Army Air Force. Neither the Ki-62 project or its Ki-63 variant proceeded beyond the design stage.

Design and development

To compete with the Kawasaki Ki-61 as a possible new light fighter for the Imperial Japanese Army, Nakajima designer T. Koyama developed the Ki-62. The design – a low-wing, single-seat monoplane with a bubble canopy powered by an 877-kilowatt (1,175-hp) Kawasaki Ha-40 liquid-cooled engine – showed promise, but Nakajima discontinued development of the Ki-62 in order to focus on production of its Ki-43 and Ki-44 fighters. The Ki-62 design was not wasted effort, however, as Nakajima later incorporated Ki-62 design features and data into its Ki-84 fighter.

Variants
Nakajima also planned the Ki-63, a version of the Ki-62 powered by a  Mitsubishi Ha-102 radial engine, but did not pursue the design.

Specifications

See also

References

Notes

Ki-62, Nakajima
Ki-62
Ki-62, Nakajima
Ki-62, Nakajima